The Moru–Madi languages of the Central Sudanic language family are a cluster of closely related languages spoken in South Sudan, the Democratic Republic of Congo, and Uganda. Moru is spoken by 100,000 people, and Ma'di is spoken by twice that number. The most populous languages are Aringa of Uganda, with close to a million speakers, and Lugbara, with 1.6 million.

Languages 
The languages in this cluster are found across three countries: Uganda (Ma'di, Lugbara, Aringa, S. Ma'di); South Sudan (Aringa, Ma'di, Lolu'bo, Avukaya, Kaliko, Moru, and Logo); and the Democratic Republic of Congo (Lugbara, Avukaya, Kaliko, and Logo).
Moru (Wa'di variety divergent)
Avokaya
Keliko
Omi
Lugbara 
 Okollo–Ogoko–Rigbo
Logo
Aringa (Lower Lugbara)
Ma'di (Moyo, Adjumani (Oyuwi), Pandikeri, Lokai, Burulo dialects)
Olu'bo (Lolubo)

The name 'Madi' 
The name Ma'di is used for various peoples in the region. There is a tendency, especially in the Acholi region of northern Uganda, to refer to anyone from West Nile Region as a Ma'di, even the Kakwa. The only group in this region who are never called Ma'di are the Alur.

Joseph Pasquale Crazzolara, for example, states that "all Logbara [...] agree that they are of the Ma'di nation, that they are Ma'di. They are called Ma'di by the Alur of Okooro, their immediate neighbours, in Bunyoro and Buganda." Similarly, the linguist A. N. Tucker described the neighboring Keliko people who occupy the high plateau near the Logbara, as having the "real name Ma'di". However, the Keliko regard themselves as Keliko rather than as Ma'di.

Comparative vocabulary
Sample basic vocabulary of Moru-Ma'di languages from Boone & Watson (1996):

References 

 Nilo-Saharan list (Blench 2000)

Languages of Chad
Languages of South Sudan
Languages of the Democratic Republic of the Congo
Languages of Uganda